Wanda is a female given name of Polish origin. It probably derives from the tribal name of the Wends. The name has long been popular in Poland where the legend of Princess Wanda has been circulating since at least the 12th century. In 1947, Wanda was cited as the second most popular name, after Mary, for Polish girls, and the most popular from Polish secular history. The name was made familiar in the English-speaking world by the 1883 novel Wanda, written by Ouida, the story line of which is based on the last years of the Hechingen branch of the Swabian House of Hohenzollern.  In the United States, Wanda attained its highest popularity in the year 1934, peaking then at No. 47 on the list of names most frequently given to female infants. The name is popularly misnterpreted as meaning "wanderer."

Namesakes 
Wanda Barzee (born 1945), American criminal convicted of the  Kidnapping of Elizabeth Smart
Wanda Coleman (1946–2013), American poet
Wanda Cowley (1924–2017), New Zealand children's writer
Wanda Hazel Gág (1893–1946), American author and illustrator of  the children's book Millions of Cats 
Wanda Gertz (1896–1958)
Wanda Guenette (born 1962), Canadian volleyball player
Wanda Hawley (1895–1963), American silent film-era actress
Wanda Hendrix (1928–1981), American film actress
Wanda Hutchinson (born 1951), American R&B singer (the Emotions)
Wanda Jackson (born 1937), American rockabilly singer
Wanda Jakubowska (1907–1998)
Wanda Klaff (1922–1946), German Nazi concentration camp overseer executed for war crimes
Wanda Kosakiewicz (1917–1989), French stage actress and love interest of both Jean-Paul Sartre and Albert Camus. Sartre dedicated his The Roads to Freedom trilogy to her.
Wanda Krahelska-Filipowicz (1886–1968), World War II anti-Nazi Polish leader
Wanda Lyzwinska (born 1953)
Wanda Landowska (1877–1959)
Wanda Malecka (1800–1860)
Wanda Panfil (born 1959)
Wanda Piłsudska (1918–2001)
Wanda Rijo (born 1979), Dominican Republic weightlifter
Wanda Rutkiewicz (1943–1992), Polish mountain climber
Wanda Stopa (1900–1924), Polish-American attorney and murderer.
Wanda Sykes (born 1962), American actress, comedian, and writer.
Wanda Tinasky (pseudonym)
Wanda Toscanini Horowitz (1907–1998)
Wanda Vazquez Garced (born 1960), Governor of Puerto Rico
Wanda Ventham, (born 1935), English actress
Wanda Wasilewska (1905–1964)
Wanda Wiłkomirska (1929–2018)
Wanda Young (1943–2021), American R&B singer (the Marvelettes)

Characters
Princess Wanda, legendary heroine in Polish folk mythology
Vanda, the title and protagonist of the 1876 Antonín Dvořák grand opera
Wanda Maximoff, alter-ego of the Avengers comic-book character Scarlet Witch (1964–continuing)
Wanda Maximoff, a film character based on Scarlet Witch.
Wanda, protagonist of the 1970 movie of the same name, written, directed and starring Barbara Loden
Wanda Firebaugh, character from the webcomic Erfworld (2007–continuing)
Wanda Seldon, key character in the 1993 novel Forward the Foundation, part of Isaac Asimov's Foundation series
Wanda, the protagonist of the 1809 stage play Wanda written by German poet Zacharias Werner and directed by Johann Wolfgang von Goethe
Wanda, heroine of the 1840 narrative poem Wanda by the Polish poet C. K. Norwid
Wanda, subject of the 1868 play Wanda, the Polish Queen by the Croatian dramatist Matija Ban
Wanda von Dunajew, protagonist of Leopold von Sacher-Masoch's 1870 novel Venus in Furs
Wanda von Chabert, the protagonist of the 1881 Guy de Maupassant story In Various Roles
Wanda von Szalras, heroine of Wanda, the 1883 novel and stage play by Ouida (Maria Louise Ramé)
Wanda, the protagonist of the 1928 novel Wanda (Der Dämon) by Nobel Prize-winning novelist Gerhart Hauptmann
Wanda Petronski, the child protagonist of the 1944 novel The Hundred Dresses by Eleanor Estes
Wanda Cavalli, primary character in the 1952 movie The White Sheik directed by Federico Fellini
Wanda Von Kreesus, the main character in the 1973–1980 adult comic strip Wicked Wanda
Wanda Nevada, heroine of the 1979 movie Wanda Nevada played by Brooke Shields
Wanda Gershwitz and Wanda the goldfish, characters in the 1988 movie A Fish Called Wanda
Wanda Woodward, character in the 1990 movie Cry-Baby, played by Traci Lords
Wanda, a key character in Todd McFarlane's 1992–continuing Spawn comic-book series, as well as the 1997 movie and 1997-99 TV series
Wanda, the main controllable character in the 1993 video game Mario & Wario
Wanda, a popular recurring character in the 1990–94 TV series In Living Color played by actor Jamie Foxx
Wanda, the nickname of the Wandering Swordsman, a member of the Ancient Alliance of Askara, in the 1997 video game Tibia
Wanda, cartoon character from The Fairly OddParents TV series (2001–2017)
Wanda MacPherson, a character from the comic strip and 2000–2002 TV series Baby Blues
Wanda, the main character in the 2005 video game Shadow of the Colossus
Wanda, the human name given to the protagonist in the 2008 Stephenie Meyer novel The Host
Wanda Dollard, a character on the 2004–2009 TV series Corner Gas
Wanda, the character played by Diora Baird in Episode 16, Season 6  (2009) of Two and a Half Men
Wanda Slater, the character Wilhelmina Slater's actual name in the 2006–2010 TV series Ugly Betty
Wanda Powell, a fictional character in The Simpsons
Wanda, part of the singing duo Wayne and Wanda on The Muppet Show

Music
 Kinda Fonda Wanda a song by Neil Young on his 1983 album Everybody's Rockin'

See also

References

Polish feminine given names
Slavic feminine given names
English feminine given names
Feminine given names